Alexander Petrovich Sokolov (Russian: Александр Петрович Соколов; 10 November 1829, Saint Petersburg - 2 December 1913, Saint Petersburg) was a Russian portrait painter in the Academic style. His brothers, Pyotr and Pavel were also well-known artists.

Biography 
His father was the portrait painter, Pyotr Sokolov. Alexander Brullov and Karl Brullov were his uncles. He left the gymnasium in 1847, before completing his studies, to enter the Moscow School of Painting, Sculpture and Architecture. After two years there, he entered the Imperial Academy of Arts.

Upon receiving the title of "Artist", he decided to follow in his father's footsteps and devote himself mostly to watercolor portraiture. In 1859, a painting of his brother, Pyotr, was among those that won him the title of "Academician".

In 1881, he became a member of the Peredvizhniki and exhibited with them frequently. He became especially well known for portraits of women, doing several of Maria Feodorovna and other members of the Imperial Family. In 1883, his portraits of Tsar Alexander III and the Tsarina in their Imperial robes were included in the official Coronation Album.

from 1892 to 1907, he served as curator of the Russian Academy of Arts Museum; housed at the Imperial Academy. He became a full member of the Academy in 1896.

Writings 
 Пётр Фёдорович Соколов, основатель портретной акварельной живописи в России. 1787-1848 (memoirs of his father), Russkaya Starina, 1882 vol.33 #3,  Gateway to text

Works

References

External links 

1829 births
1913 deaths
19th-century painters from the Russian Empire
Russian male painters
20th-century Russian painters
Russian portrait painters
Russian watercolorists
Curators from Moscow
Painters from Saint Petersburg
19th-century male artists from the Russian Empire
20th-century Russian male artists
Moscow School of Painting, Sculpture and Architecture alumni